Merseyside Fire and Rescue Service is the statutory fire and rescue service covering the county of Merseyside in north-west England and is the statutory Fire and Rescue Authority responsible for all 999 fire brigade calls in Sefton, Knowsley, St. Helens, Liverpool and Wirral.

History
In 1974, the merger of the following borough fire brigades: City of Liverpool, Birkenhead, Bootle, Southport, St Helens, and Wallasey. As well as parts of Lancashire County Fire Brigade and Cheshire County Fire Brigade to create Merseyside Fire Brigade.

Merseyside Fire Brigade became Merseyside Fire and Civil Defence Authority on 1 April 1986, as established by the Local Government Act 1985.

In an effort to modernise fire services nationally, the Fire and Rescue Services Act 2004 received Royal Assent on 22 July 2004. This legislation changed the name to Merseyside Fire and Rescue Authority. The change of name also reflects the fact that the service, in addition to fighting fire, conducts rescues such as road traffic collisions and is heavily involved in prevention work in communities.

Merseyside Fire and Rescue Authority Headquarters is located on Bridle Road, Bootle

Since 2013, the MACC relocated from Derby Road, Kirkdale to a purpose built joint control centre with Merseyside Police, which is also located at the Bridle Road site.

Merseyside Fire and Rescue Authority is made up of five area commands as follows: Liverpool, Wirral, Sefton, Knowsley, and St Helens. Within these areas are: 
 14 wholetime fire stations
 Four (LLAR) Low Level Activity & Risk (Day cover 10:00–22:00, stand down 22:00–10:00)
 One wholetime marine rescue station
 Two wholetime / day-crewed station (30 minutes resilience)
 One resilience station (30 minutes resilience)
Which provides Merseyside with 24-hour fire cover.

Performance
In 2018/2019, every fire and rescue service in England and Wales was subjected to a statutory inspection by Her Majesty's Inspectorate of Constabulary and Fire & Rescue Services (HIMCFRS). Another cycle of inspections was carried out starting in 2021.The inspections investigate how well the service performs in each of three areas. On a scale of outstanding, good, requires improvement and inadequate, Merseyside Fire and Rescue Service was rated as follows:

See also
Fire Service in the UK
List of British firefighters killed in the line of duty
Liverpool Salvage Corps
Motorcycles in the United Kingdom fire services

References

External links

Merseyside Fire and Rescue Service at HMICFRS

Organisations based in Merseyside
Fire and rescue services of England
1974 establishments in England
Organizations established in 1974